The Willow Board is a Ukrainian folk song that is traditionally sang during an ancient traditional Ukrainian spring game called the Willow Board also known under many other alternative Ukrainin names such as Noise, via Bridges, Bug ( or ), Goalkeeper etc.

The song became newly popular in Ukraine in late 1960-s through the popularization of the 1965 rendition of the song by Ukrainian composer Myroslav Skoryk as used in the soundtrack of 1965 Ukrainina film  Shadows of Forgotten Ancestors.

The Song

References

External links 
 Adaptations and cover versions
 A Hawk and a Hacksaw's rendition (music) of Вербова дощечка (under the title 'Wedding Theme Ukraine') sang by an unknown choir (vocals), as is heard in track 4 of their album You Have Already Gone To The Other World
 Myroslav Skoryk's rendition (music) of Вербова дощечка (under the title 'Ivan & Palahna') sang by an unknown choir (vocals), as is heard in track 12 of the unofficial soundtrack of Shadows of Forgotten Ancestors
 's rendition (music) of Вербова дощечка  sang by Veryovka Choir (soloist: Natalka Velychko)
 Anatoliy Avdiyevskyi's rendition (music) of Вербова дощечка  sang by Poltava Pedagogic University 'Kalyna' Choir
 Sergei Parajanov's adaptation Вербова дощечка
 Hrystyna Chevereniuk's adaptation Вербова дощечка
 Chur's folk metal adaptation Вербова дощечка 

Ukrainian folk songs
Year of song unknown
Songwriter unknown